The 1942 United States Senate election in Mississippi was held on November 3, 1942. Incumbent Democratic U.S. Senator Wall Doxey, who had won a special election the year prior to complete the unexpired term of Pat Harrison, ran for a full term in office. He was defeated by James Eastland who was appointed to and held the seat prior to Doxey's wins.

Because Eastland faced no opposition in the general election, his victory in the September 15 primary was tantamount to election.

Democratic primary

Candidates
Ross A. Collins, U.S. Representative from Meridian and candidate for Senate in 1934 and 1941
Wall Doxey, incumbent Senator since 1941
James Eastland, former State Representative from Doddsville, Scott County and interim Senator in 1941
Douglas R. Smith
Roland Wall

Results

Runoff

General election

Results

See also 
 1942 United States Senate elections

Notes

References 

Single-candidate elections
1942
MIssissippi
1942 Mississippi elections